Sam Cook (born 1 August 1993) is a New Zealand professional rugby league footballer who last played as a  for the New Zealand Warriors in the NRL.

Background
Born in Auckland, New Zealand, Cook is of Māori descent. Cook played his junior rugby league for the Northcote Tigers before being signed the New Zealand Warriors. Cook played in the Warriors NYC team in 2013. In 2017, Cook was selected in the Warriors 2017 NRL Auckland Nines squad.

Playing career

2018
After showing good form in the trial matches, Cook had beaten the likes of Jazz Tevaga for the utility bench role for Round 1. In Round 1 of the 2018 NRL season, Cook made his NRL debut for the New Zealand Warriors against the South Sydney Rabbitohs, playing off the interchange bench in the 32-20 win at Perth Stadium.

References

External links
New Zealand Warriors profile

1993 births
Living people
New Zealand rugby league players
New Zealand Māori rugby league players
New Zealand Warriors players
Rugby league hookers
Rugby league players from Auckland